Soman Chainani is an American author and filmmaker, best known for writing the children's book series The School for Good and Evil.

Early life and education
Chainani grew up in Key Biscayne, Florida, where his family was one of the few of Indian descent. He attended Harvard University, where he graduated with a degree in English and American Literature in 2001. As of 2003 he resided in New York City. After graduation, he went on to attend Columbia University, where he participated in their MFA Film Program.

Career
Soman's series, The School for Good and Evil, debuted on the New York Times Bestseller List, has sold more than 3.5 million copies, been translated into 32 languages across 6 continents, and has been adapted into a major motion picture from Netflix that debuted at #1 in over 80 countries.

His other books in the School for Good and Evil series – A World Without Princes, The Last Ever After, Quests for Glory, A Crystal of Time and One True King – have all debuted on the New York Times Bestseller List as well.

His book of retold fairytales, Beasts and Beauty, was released on September 21, 2021, to wide acclaim, with Kirkus Reviews calling the collection "expertly crafted... evoking the wonder, terror, and magic of the fantasy realms." Beasts & Beauty was an instant New York Times bestseller, Soman’s seventh New York Times bestseller in a row, and is slated to be a limited television series from Sony 3000, with Soman writing and executive producing. Together, Chainani's books have been on the New York Times Bestseller List for 44 weeks.

His book, Rise of the School for Good and Evil was released on May 31, 2022, to high acclaim and the New York Times Bestseller list. Publishers Weekly described it as “an episodic, adventurous fantasy offering.” A sequel, Fall of the School for Good and Evil is expected in May 2023.

Bibliography

The School for Good and Evil

The School Years
 The School for Good and Evil (2013)
 A World Without Princes (2014)
 The Last Ever After (2015)
 The Ever Never Handbook (companion) (2016)
The Camelot Years
 Quests for Glory (2017)
 A Crystal of Time (2019)
 One True King (2020)
Prequel
 Rise of the School for Good and Evil (2022)
 Fall of the School for Good and Evil (2023)

Short stories 
 "Flying Lessons" in Flying Lessons & Other Stories, edited by Ellen Oh (2017)
 "Gwen and Art and Lance" in Because You Love to Hate Me: 13 Tales of Villainy, edited by Amerie (2017)

Other titles 
 Beasts and Beauty: Dangerous Tales (2021)

Awards
The School for Good and Evil
 New York Times Bestseller
ABA Indie List Bestseller
Waterstone's Children's Book Prize for Best Fiction for 5–12 (2014, nominee for The School for Good and Evil)
A Barnes & Noble Best Book of 2013
A Books-a-Million Best Book of 2013
Entertainment Weekly PopWatch Pick
Children's Choice Reading List Selection 
Goodreads Choice Semi-finalist (Best Children's Book)
IndieNext Pick

A World Without Princes
New York Times Bestseller
ABA Indie List Bestseller
Goodreads Choice Finalist (Best Children's Book)

The Last Ever After
 New York Times Bestseller
 ABA Indie List Bestseller
 A Barnes & Noble Best Book of 2015
 Goodreads Choice Runner-up (Best Children's Book)

Filmography 
 2006: Davy and Stu (short)
 2007: Kali Ma (short), Boys Life 6
 2022: The School for Good and Evil (Executive Producer)

References

External links

 Official website
 
 Princess Not So Charming at Harvard Magazine
 
 

21st-century American male writers
21st-century American novelists
American children's writers
American fantasy writers
American filmmakers
American male novelists
American novelists of Indian descent
Columbia University School of the Arts alumni
Harvard College alumni
American LGBT people of Asian descent
LGBT people from Florida
LGBT film producers
LGBT film directors
American gay writers
American LGBT screenwriters
Living people
Novelists from Florida
People from Key Biscayne, Florida
Writers from Miami
People from Florida
1979 births
The School for Good and Evil